Tagata Pasifika is an English language New Zealand programme which screens on TVNZ's TV ONE and on Māori Television. This programme is made to specifically meet the niche market of New Zealand's Pacific Islander (Pasifika) population.

Content
Tagata Pasifika features current events from both New Zealand and Polynesia. The show features report coverage of Pacific Island cultural events such as the annual Pasifika festival along with arts and profiles.

TAGATA PASIFIKA was first coined in the mid 1980s as a reference to people with genealogical connections to islands within Melanesia, Polynesia, Micronesia, French Polynesia and all others scattered throughout the Pacific Ocean but had chosen to live in Aotearoa New Zealand and identified Aotearoa New Zealand as their home base. There has been some dispute over the correct spelling of Pasifika, sometimes spelt Pasefika, Pacifica, Pacifika. TAGATA PASIFIKA is generally accepted as correct and publicly reinforced by the Television New Zealand programme now also known by the same name but was previously spelt TANGATA PASIFIKA.

Reporters
John Utanga (Cook Islander)
Marama T-Pole (Tuvaluan)
John Pulu (Tongan)
Soana Aholelei (Tongan)
Karima Fai'ai (Samoan)
Alistar Kata (Cook Islander)
Johnson Raela (Cook Islander)
Taylor Aumua (Fijian Samoan)
Moana Makapelu Lee (Niuean/Cook Islander)

External links
 Website 

Television shows funded by NZ on Air
New Zealand television talk shows
1987 New Zealand television series debuts